Omerta – City of Gangsters is a simulation game with turn-based tactical game-play elements developed by Haemimont Games and published by Kalypso Media for Microsoft Windows, Mac OS X and the Xbox 360. The game was released in German-speaking countries on 31 January 2013. The international German download version for Windows was released through the Steam-service as well. The English version was released just a day after in the rest of Europe, and in Australia on 7 February for the PC version, whereas the version for the US market was released on 12 February, followed by the release of the Xbox 360 version in Australia the day after. A version for Mac OS X was published on 2 August 2013.

Plot 
As displayed on the cover, the game takes place during the 1920s – the Roaring Twenties – at the time of Prohibition. The game's story takes place in Atlantic City, where, due to a national ban on alcohol that turned it into a highly profitable and illegal product, Mafia organizations were able to become powerful, rich, and influential off the back of the illegal stills that produced bootleg alcohol and the speakeasys that served it to a wide and diverse range of customers.

In a time where criminal gangs practically ran Atlantic City and a handful of morally questionable men were able to prosper beyond their wildest dreams through gambling dens, quality spirits, and shady machinations, the player takes control of one such man as he strives to build an empire of his own in this melting pot of illegality. "Boss" D'Angelo is an Italian immigrant who was born in a small village in Sicily and has just arrived in Atlantic City. Working his way up from nothing, he must establish himself in the criminal underworld of the Mafia by buying and setting up illegal businesses, attacking rivals, and making friends, all the while simultaneously fulfilling his quest to attain the quintessential American Dream.

Story

Arriving in Atlantic City, Boss D'Angelo begins his rise through the ranks of the Mafia as he works his way up from dealing bootleg alcohol to establishing and managing his own network of bootleggers and gambling joints. Sending money back to his brother in Sicily, he manages to hide his role as a top underling of Louie Castaneda, a caporegime under Danny Corsini, the boss of the most powerful Mafia family in Atlantic City. As a member of the Corsini family, the Boss comes in conflict with enemies ranging from rival Irish and Jewish gangsters to the Ku Klux Klan, made up of native-born Americans who blame immigrants for the rise in crime. Just as the Boss finds himself discontented with his position under Louie, the capo assigns him to take part in a hit on an unidentified mobster; the Boss realizes just in time that the intended target is Danny Corsini. He foils the attempted assassination, executes Louie for his betrayal, and becomes Corsini's top lieutenant.

Eventually, the Boss runs into a new problem when his brother immigrates to the United States and joins the FBI as a field agent in their New York office. He is subsequently assigned to investigate the Corsini family when they attempt to create a new source of revenue through the nightclub/illegal gambling trade; Danny Corsini orders the Boss to have his own brother killed. Forced to turn on Corsini, the Boss murders him and seizes control of the family. Knowing that his position is fragile, he attempts to build an alliance with the warring Irish and Jewish mobs, but in doing so starts a new war with the KKK. The D'Angelo family wipes out the KKK and the alliance goes through, with the Boss being named Capo di Tutti. He then tries to move the family in a more legitimate direction and secure his position by investing in real estate and by getting his ally, Mr. Smith, elected as mayor. His brother then warns him that the FBI is building a case against him and that the only way to avoid prosecution and imprisonment is to become an informant. The Boss refuses to betray his men like those before him did and cripples the FBI's case by having their witnesses murdered. The Boss, now at the peak of his power, makes amends with his brother and eventually retires from the Mafia in peace, using his fortune to purchase a private island which he calls "Nova Sicilia" (New Sicily) while his brother resigns from the FBI to pursue his dream of being a shipwright. The brothers make a vow that they will never again speak of their younger days.

The Japanese Incentive

During his time working under Louie Castaneda, Boss D'Angelo enters into a partnership with Yakuza boss Hikaro Eda and Karl Fritz, a wealthy German-American financier recruited by the ambitious Eda to set up Yakuza operations in America due to laws that prohibit Asians from directly owning American property. The Boss also meets the beautiful Mikoto Mori, Eda's trophy wife who occasionally commits murders for her husband. What he doesn't realize is that she has a personal vendetta against Eda and the Boss soon finds himself caught between his love for Mikoto and the wrath of the Yakuza.

The story begins with Fritz approaching the Boss and informing him of Eda's offer; Eda's associates have already encroached on the Irish McGyure Clan's turf and the Boss sees a valuable opportunity. He accepts Eda's offer and agrees to protect a valuable cargo being moved into the city on his behalf. After preventing the McGyure Clan from destroying the cargo in revenge, the Boss discovers what it actually consists of: Eda's wife, Mikoto Mori. Furious that anyone would try to harm her, he improves his standing with Eda by having the McGyure Clan completely wiped out in an attack. When Eda and his men are then ambushed at a cherry blossom festival by members of the Ku Klux Klan, the Boss investigates and learns that it was Mikoto who betrayed him. Realizing that Eda will almost certainly have her killed and growing tired of his criminal ways, the Boss tries to run away with Mikoto but is soon tracked down by Eda's gang, who have orders to take them both out. Mikoto reveals her past: her family's lands was seized by Eda, who then murdered her sister and forced Mikoto to marry him. The two realize they have feelings for each other and decide to steal Eda's personal assets to finance their escape, but the heist quickly goes wrong when Mikoto abandons the Boss for a chance to murder Eda herself, only to get killed. In a fit of rage, the Boss brutally slays Eda as he bitterly says that she was the first and now the last woman he had ever truly loved.

Trivia 
Omerta, the game's title, refers to the infamous honor code known as "omertà", a code of silence which binds members of the Mafia or similar criminal organizations to professional discretion against any third parties.

Upon the official retail-release of the boxed- and digital distributed version, the game was also simultaneously released on GOG.com without any copy-protection, nor other digital rights management restrictions.

Gameplay 
Starting out as a low-level bootlegger, the player gradually builds up his criminal career, eventually advancing highly enough to establish his own businesses. The player can purchase untenanted shops, buildings, and structures to establish bars for serving alcohol, and breweries or distilleries for producing it. The player can also buy out opposing speakeasies from their owners to increase profits. A more legal way for generating income is buying apartments and then collecting rents from the tenants who lease them. Warehouses can be acquired to increase storage capacity for bootleg alcohol or to open up additional means for alcohol production.

As the game progresses, the character can recruit companions, form a gang to protect his business interests, and conquer the territories of rival gangsters. Characters provide specific role-playing elements based on their individual characteristics and equipment. In turn-based confrontations, the player expands his influence by using his henchmen to drive other bosses out of business through violence and intimidation, until he can ultimately reign supreme as the unchallenged godfather of Atlantic City organized crime.

In addition to co-operative and competitive multiplayer game-play, the game offers a sandbox mode to freely explore the game world, consisting of six district maps covering a recreation of 1920s Atlantic City.

Historical background 

The game provides an explorable three-dimensional world which is displayed through a Top-down perspective. The in-game world represents, according to the publisher Kalypso Media, an almost accurate and historical correct reproduction of Atlantic City during Prohibition times.

Real buildings and places are present like the Traymore Hotel, the Absecon Lighthouse, the Atlantic City Jailhouse, or the board-walk "Eastern Promenade" as well as streets like "Illinois Avenue" or "North Carolina Avenue", which ends at the beach. Beside those real buildings, the remaining ones –  which are shown in the Art Deco style consistent with the period –  are very similar to each other and seem to only consist of a few design types.

Licensing of name 
Kalypso Media licensed the name Omerta from the MMORPG browser-based game of the same name, Omerta.

Reception 

The PC version received "mixed" reviews, while the Xbox 360 version received "generally unfavourable reviews", according to the review aggregation website Metacritic.

PC Gamer praised the former version's mechanics as well as the AI while comparing its combat style elements to X-COM or Jagged Alliance. The story is described as too superficial, simple, and depth-less. The atmospheric music, on the other hand, was lauded as a brilliant melange of the jazz, ragtime and klezmer music of the period.

Metro, however, criticised the same PC version. Initially intrigued by the promise of a new kind of "made-men" game, the turn-based combat system was ultimately deemed ungainly.

The Digital Fix gave it a score of five out of ten, saying that the game was "Best avoided by anyone seeking a real challenge or keen to get their teeth into some serious multiplayer gaming!" The Escapist also gave it two-and-a-half stars out of five, calling it "a deeply flawed blend of real time strategy and tactical turn-based battles that doesn't live up to the expectations of its premise."

References

External links 
 Official games website
 Omerta –  City of Gangsters (inoff. Wiki)
 Omerta –  City of Gangsters on GOG.com (Digital Download)
 

2013 video games
Business simulation games
MacOS games
Organized crime video games
Video games developed in Bulgaria
Video games set in the 1920s
Video games set in New Jersey
Windows games
Works about the American Mafia
Works about the Yakuza
Xbox 360 games